Liucun may refer to the following places in China:

Liucun, Beijing
Liucun, Baoding, Hebei
Liucun, Shanxi, in Linfen, Shanxi
Liucun Township, Hebei, in Shenze County, Hebei
Liucun Township, Henan, in Neihuang County, Henan
Liucun station, a station of Nanjing Metro in Nanjing, Jiangsu